The Biak scrubfowl or Biak megapode (Megapodius geelvinkianus) is a species of bird in the family Megapodiidae. It is found only on the islands of Biak, Mios Korwar, Numfor, Manim and Mios Num in the West Papua region of Indonesia.

Description 
Its plumage is largely dark grey. It has a slight crest and a reddish or bluish face. Legs are red or dark grey.

Habitat 
Its natural habitats are subtropical or tropical moist lowland forest and subtropical or tropical moist shrubland. It is threatened by habitat loss.

Some taxonomists consider this to be a subspecies of the dusky megapode, others as a subspecies of the orange-footed scrubfowl, but is increasingly looked at as a distinct species.

References

External links

 
 

Biak scrubfowl
Birds of the Schouten Islands
Biak scrubfowl
Taxonomy articles created by Polbot